The 8th Army was an army level command of the German Army in World War I.  It was formed on mobilization in August 1914 from the I Army Inspectorate.  The army was dissolved on 29 September 1915, but reformed on 30 December 1915. It was finally disbanded in 1919 during demobilization after the war.

History 
On mobilisation in August 1914, the 8th Army Headquarters was formed in Posen to command troops stationed in East Prussia to defend against the expected Russian attack, Plan XIX.  Initially, the Army commanded the following formations:

Concerned by the defeat at Gumbinnen and the continued advance of the Russian Second Army from the south, Prittwitz ordered a retreat to the Vistula, effectively abandoning East Prussia. When he heard of this, Helmuth von Moltke, the German Army Chief of Staff, recalled Prittwitz and his deputy to Berlin. They were replaced by Paul von Hindenburg, called out of retirement, with Erich Ludendorff as his chief of staff.  Under its new command, the Army was responsible for the victories at the Battles of Tannenberg and Masurian Lakes.

Dissolved and reformed 
The Army of the Niemen was formed on 26 May 1915 to control the troops in Courland.  The commander of the 8th Army, General der Infanterie Otto von Below, along with his chief of staff, Generalmajor von Böckmann, assumed command.  In the meantime, the 8th Army got a deputy commander, General der Artillerie Friedrich von Scholtz, who was simultaneously commander of XX Corps.  8th Army was dissolved on 29 September 1915.  On 30 December 1915 the Army of the Niemen was renamed as the 8th Army with von Below still in command.

Commanders 
The original 8th Army had the following commanders from mobilisation until it was dissolved 29 September 1915.

A "new" 8th Army was formed by renaming the Army of the Niemen on 30 December 1915.  It was dissolved after the end of the war on 21 January 1919.

Glossary 
Armee-Abteilung or Army Detachment in the sense of "something detached from an Army".  It is not under the command of an Army so is in itself a small Army.
Armee-Gruppe or Army Group in the sense of a group within an Army and under its command, generally formed as a temporary measure for a specific task.
Heeresgruppe or Army Group in the sense of a number of armies under a single commander.

See also 

8th Army (Wehrmacht) for the equivalent formation in World War II
German Army order of battle (1914)
Order of battle at Tannenberg
Great Retreat (Russian)

References

Bibliography 
 

08
Military units and formations established in 1914
Military units and formations disestablished in 1915
Military units and formations established in 1915
Military units and formations disestablished in 1919